Shane Moloney (born 4 March 1993) is an Irish hurler who plays as a corner-forward for the Galway senior team. At club level he plays with Tynagh-Abbey/Duniry.

Moloney captained Galway as they won the All-Ireland title in 2011 where he scored 1-9 in the final against Dublin.	
On 16 August 2015, he came on as a substitute with five minutes remaining in Galway's All-Ireland Senior Hurling Semi-final against Tipperary. With the game into the last of the three minutes of stoppage time, Moloney scored the winning point to put Galway into the final.

On 3 September 2017, Moloney came on as a substitute for Galway in the second half as they won their first All-Ireland Senior Hurling Championship in 29 years against Waterford.

Honours
Galway
 All-Ireland Senior Hurling Championship (1): 2017 (c)
National Hurling League Division 1 (1): 2017
Leinster Senior Hurling Championship (1): 2017

References

1993 births
Living people
Galway inter-county hurlers
Tynagh-Abbey/Duniry hurlers